Kuehne + Nagel International AG (or Kühne + Nagel) is a global transport and logistics company based in Schindellegi, Switzerland. It was founded in 1890, in Bremen, Germany, by August Kühne and Friedrich Nagel. It provides sea freight and airfreight forwarding, contract logistics, and overland businesses. In 2010, Kuehne + Nagel was the leading global freight forwarder, accounting for nearly 15% of the world's air and sea freight business by revenue, ahead of DHL Global Forwarding, DB Schenker Logistics, and Panalpina. As of 2022, it has nearly 1,300 offices in 106 countries, with over 78,000 employees.

History

Early years and evolution: 1890 - 1950s
The origins of Kuehne + Nagel was in 1890, when August Kühne and Friedrich Nagel founded a forwarding commission agency in Bremen, Germany. It initially used to concentrate on cotton and consolidated freight. Later in 1902, it expanded its operations to the German seaport city of Hamburg.

In 1907, the co-founder Friedrich Nagel died, and August Kühne took over his shares in the company. The legacy of Nagel still lives on, in the company's name - Kuehne + Nagel (KN). The First World War greatly affected its businesses.

Upon Kühne's death in 1932, his sons - Alfred and Werner - became partners in the firm. Adolf Maass (1875 - probably early in 1945 in Auschwitz concentration camp), who was Jewish, a partner, and one of the firm's shareholder with a 45% stake, was forced out in April 1933. On the 1st of May 1933 Alfred and Werner Kühne joined the Nazi Party, and under the brothers' management the firm played a prominent role in the transport of property seized from Jews in occupied territories.

Transition to a Swiss holding co., and expansion: 1950s - 1990s
In the early 1950s, Alfred Kühne initiated the company's international expansion; and KN expanded its operations into Canada, with the opening of branch offices in Toronto, Ontario and Montreal, Quebec. In 1963, KN took a controlling stake in Athens based Proodos S.A, and also expanded into Italy. In 1975, the company adopted a holding company structure, with the formation of Kuehne + Nagel International AG based in Schindellegi, Switzerland, as the ultimate holding company.

In the mid-1960s, a third-generation member of the Kühne family, Klaus-Michael Kühne joined his father Alfred Kühne as a junior partner, having completed an apprenticeship in banking. In 1966, at the age of 30, he joined the management team as executive chairman; and spearheaded KN's future expansion, particularly its European and the Far Eastern operations.

In 1981, Alfred Kühne died; and in July the same year, due to the losses sustained by the Kühne family in attempting to expand its shipping fleet, a 50% stake in KN was sold to the British conglomerate Lonrho Plc for 90 million DM. Following the purchase, Klaus-Michael Kühne and Lonrho's head, Roland "Tiny" Rowland acted as joint chief executives of the combined organisation. KN further expanded with its acquisition of freight companies: Domenichelli SpA (Italy), Van Vliet BV (Netherlands), Hollis Transport Group Ltd. (UK), Transportes Tres (Spain), and other acquisitions in Denmark, Norway, and Sweden.

Further expansion: 1990s - present
The 1990 German reunification was an important event for many German companies, including KN; and provided them the necessary impetus to expand further. After the reunification, KN integrated its network in the former German Democratic Republic, and consolidated its operations. In 1992, it bought back Lonrho plc's 50% stake in the company; and went public in May 1994. It was listed on the Zurich and Frankfurt exchanges, which provided a platform for further exchange-based acquisitions. The same year, KN established a Russian subsidiary; and pushed ahead into Norway, Sweden, and Denmark.

In the mid 1990s, strategic focus given to expand the lucrative logistics-related contracts / operations paid off - one being with DuPont in which KN would operate the chemical giant's leveraged distribution activities in Europe, the Middle East, and Africa. In July 1999, Kühne handed over the post of CEO to Klaus Herms, and continued as the executive chairman and president of the board.

In the early 2000s, KN got a foothold in the Asia Pacific contract logistics market, when it forged a strategic alliance with Singapore-based SembCorp Logistics. In 2001, it acquired USCO Logistics Inc. - a warehouse-based logistics service provider based in Hamden, Connecticut, for US$300 million. KN and SembCorp chose to follow different strategic paths in 2004, and ended their strategic partnership.

In October 2007, the board of KN appointed Reinhard Lange as the successor to CEO Klaus Herms, effective June 2009 to ensure a smooth handover. The succession plan was similar to the SAP's 2007 CEO transition plan from Henning Kagermann to Léo Apotheker, which received praise in the media.

In 2012, Kuehne + Nagel acquired the business contracts of Canada's Perishables International Transportation (PIT) to expand into global fresh and frozen foods network.

In September 2013, Kuehne + Nagel agreed to merge its railfreight business with VTG to form VTG Rail Logistics, which would be Europe's largest private railfreight business when it starts operations in 2014.

In April 2014, Kuehne + Nagel International was fined $3.1 million for its part in a freight forwarding cartel case brought by the Commerce Commission. Kuehne + Nagel was the last defendant in the seven-year investigation involving six firms, who referred to themselves as the "Gardening Club" and used horticultural code to discuss anti-competitive practices among them. The regulator's investigation uncovered emails that referred to agreed surcharges as "the new price for asparagus for the forthcoming season" or "the price of marrows".

In June 2020 the 2021 Rugby League World Cup announced that Kuehne + Nagel would become the official Logistics Partner of the tournament, providing logistics services, including requirements for all of the 61 matches across the men’s, women’s and wheelchair tournaments, all 32 participating teams, and the fulfilment of warehousing and storage needs.

Organization
The group employs more than 78,000 people in 1000 locations in more than 100 countries and has approximately 12 million sqm of warehouse space under management. It is organised in the following five geographical divisions:

 Europe (based in Hamburg, Germany)
 Middle East and Africa (based in Dubai, United Arab Emirates)
 North America (based in Jersey City, New Jersey, United States)
 Central & South America (based in Santiago de Chile, Chile)
 Asia Pacific (based in Singapore, Singapore)

Operations
Kühne + Nagel is divided into the following operating segments:

 Sea Logistics
 Air Logistics
 Road Logistics
 Contract Logistics
 Rail Logistics

Services
Kühne + Nagel provides sea freight and airfreight forwarding, contract logistics and overland businesses; with a focus on providing IT-based logistics.

Its freight forwarding (sea / air) services, include the necessary arrangement for the transport of goods by road and rail. Its contract logistics unit offers warehousing and distribution services.

KN Integrated Logistics includes 4PL Management, Supplier & Inventory Management, Aftermarket Management and Supply Chain Technology. KN Integrated Logistics acts as the single point of contact with full operational responsibility with focus on supply-chain integration.

Kuehne + Nagel's solutions extend to the world's largest industries including: aerospace, automotive, fast-moving consumer goods, high-tech & consumer electronics, industrial goods, oil & gas, retail, pharma & healthcare.

Leadership

Board of Directors
 Jörg Wolle (Chairman)
 Klaus-Michael Kuehne (Honorary Chairman)
 Karl Gernandt (Vice Chairman)
 Dominik Bürgy
 Renato Fassbind
 David Kamenetzky
 Hauke Stars
 Martin C. Wittig
 Tobias B. Staehelin

Current Management Board: 
 Stefan Paul - Chief Executive Officer, since 2022
 Markus Blanka-Graff - Chief Financial Officer, since 2014
 Lothar Harings - Chief Human Resources Officer, since 2010
 Martin Kolbe - Chief Information Officer, since 2005
 Otto Schacht - Executive Vice President Sea Logistics, since 2011
 Yngve Ruud - Executive Vice President Air Logistics, since 2016
 Gianfranco Sgro - Executive Vice President Contract Logistics, since 2015
 Hansjörg Rodi - Executive Vice President Road Logistics and Sales, since 2022

Previous Chief Executive Officers 
 Detlef Trefzger - CEO, 2013 to 2022
 Reinhard Lange - CEO, 2009 to 2013
 Klaus Herms - CEO, 1999 to 2009
 Klaus-Michael Kuehne - CEO, 1966 to 1999

Suspicion of corruption 
In the 1990s, the Bavarian furniture company Chromo commissioned Kühne+Nagel to transport furniture from Asia to Germany. Kuehne+Nagel employees overcharged the company and transferred the money collected from the furniture company to a middleman in Hong Kong. And according to his own statement, he issued invoices for which he did not have to provide anything in return and repeatedly withdrew large amounts in cash from his accounts. The former managing director of the furniture company demanded that Kühne+Nagel return these 1.8 million euros.

Kühne+Nagel's former employees and lawyers repeatedly presented different versions of the justification for the costs. After 10 years of proceedings and three appeals, the court in the state of Hamburg repeatedly rejected the claim for damages. In this regard, Transparency International, Germany said that while Germany had made great strides in prosecuting individuals, it still had a lot of catching up to do in prosecuting corruption in and by companies.

See also
 Kühne School of Logistics and Management
 Freight Forwarding

References

Transport companies of Switzerland
Holding companies of Switzerland
Logistics companies of Switzerland
Railway companies of Germany
Multinational companies headquartered in Switzerland
Transport companies established in 1890
Swiss companies established in 1890
Companies listed on the SIX Swiss Exchange
Companies listed on the Frankfurt Stock Exchange